Postal inspector may refer to:

 The United States Postal Inspection Service (or USPIS), the law enforcement arm of the United States Postal Service
 Postal Inspector, a 1936 American film directed by Otto Brower

See also
 The Inspectors (TV series), postal inspector television show